Modesto is a surname originating in Latin Europe. Its meaning can be: modest, humble, simple, virtuous, among other synonyms.

Its presence is very common in Italy, Portugal and Spain. The strong wave of Italian immigration caused the surname to spread throughout the Americas, especially in Brazil, after the abolition of slavery in 1888.

People 
 Aílton de Oliveira Modesto (born 1980), Brazilian footballer (soccer)
 Antonio Modesto Quirasco (1904-1981), Mexican politician
 Arturo Modesto Tolentino (1910-2004), 12th President of the Senate of the Philippines
 Carlos Modesto Piedra (1895–1988), Provisional President of Cuba
 Claudio Modesto (born 1966), Brazilian pastor, politician, teacher and activist
 Delfim Modesto Brandão (1835-?), Civil and Governative Judge of the Couto Misto
 Enrico Modesto Bevignani (1841-1903), Italian conductor, harpsichordist, composer, and impresario
 Everton José Modesto Silva (born 1988), Brazilian footballer (soccer)
 Francesco Modesto (born 1982), Italian footballer (soccer)
 François Modesto (born 1978), French footballer (soccer)
 Jose Modesto Darcourt (1958-2014), Cuban baseball player
 Joseph Wol Modesto, South Sudanese politician
 Josué Modesto dos Passos Subrinho (born 1956), Brazilian economist, and a professor of economics at the Federal University of Sergipe
 Juan Modesto (1906–1969), Spanish soldier
 Nino Modesto (born 1980), Spanish footballer (soccer)
 Paulo Modesto da Silva Júnior (born 1993), Brazilian footballer (soccer)
 Pedro Modesto Garcia (born 1950), Puerto Rican baseball player
 Ricardo Modesto da Silva (born 1979), Brazilian footballer (soccer)
 Rodrigo Modesto (born 1987), Brazilian footballer (soccer)
 Salvador Trane Modesto (1930-2015), Roman Catholic bishop
 Thiago Modesto (born 1996), Brazilian singer, songwriter, blogger and musician

References

Surnames
Italian-language surnames
Portuguese-language surnames
Latin-language surnames